Vinicius "Vini" Helder dos Anjos Dantas (born 14 September 1989) is a Brazilian football striker who plays for Florida Tropics SC of the Major Arena Soccer League.

Career
Dantas grew up in Sao Paulo in Brazil, predominantly playing futsal. He moved to the United States at age 18 to attend Azusa Pacific University on a football scholarship. In 2011, he was spotted by former Liverpool player Jason McAteer who took him to Tranmere Rovers, where he was offered a contract. However, he was not granted a work permit in England, and the contract could not be fulfilled.

In August 2011, he signed for the Norwegian club Molde FK, and on 17 September 2011 he made his Tippeligaen debut when he replaced Daniel Chima in the 65th minute against Fredrikstad FK. Dantas scored his first goal for Molde in the club's 3-1 victory over Sarpsborg 08 on 20 November 2011. Molde won the league title in his first season, qualifying for the 2012–13 UEFA Champions League in the process. Dantas made one appearance for Molde during its qualifying rounds, coming on as a 72nd-minute substitute against FK Ventspils on 24 July 2012. During the 2012 season, Dantas played only one match for Molde but played regularly for Molde's reserve team in the Second Division where he scored 15 goals in 12 matches in 2012. In total, Dantas made six first team league appearances for Molde, scoring one goal.

On 31 August 2012, Dantas joined the First Division side Bodø/Glimt of the Tippeligaen on a free transfer. Dantas stayed at the club for one season, scoring six goals in 13 matches. In March 2013, Dantas left Norway and signed a 1-year contract for Finnish team FC Lahti of the Veikkausliiga, the top flight of Finnish football.

In 2014, Dantas joined the Canadian club Ottawa Fury FC in the NASL, and made history by scoring the first-ever goal in franchise history. Dantas went on to score two goals for Ottawa in 26 matches during the 2014 season. However, it was announced on November 26, 2014 that he would not be resigned by the club. Following his release from Ottawa, Dantas began playing indoor soccer for the Baltimore Blast of the Major Arena Soccer League. Following the season, he was named a part of the All-Rookie Team after scoring 16 goals for the team and advancing to the championship series.

On March 16, 2015, Dantas signed with United Soccer League club Pittsburgh Riverhounds. Dantas debuted for the Riverhounds on 28 March 2015 in the club's opening match of the 2015 season, a 5-2 victory over the Harrisburg City Islanders. Dantas came on as a substitute for Miroslav Čabrilo at the start of the second half and provided an assist on Rob Vincent's second goal in the 90th minute. Dantas scored his first goal for the club on the third matchday of the season, the game-tying goal of a 1–1 draw with Saint Louis FC on 11 April 2015.

In March 2022, Dantas rejoined the Baltimore Blast.

On July 13, 2022, Dantas signed with Florida Tropics SC on a two-year deal.

Career statistics

Honours
Molde
Tippeligaen: 2012

References

External links

1989 births
Living people
Association football forwards
Brazilian footballers
Molde FK players
FK Bodø/Glimt players
FC Lahti players
Ottawa Fury FC players
Pittsburgh Riverhounds SC players
Eliteserien players
Norwegian First Division players
Veikkausliiga players
North American Soccer League players
USL Championship players
Brazilian expatriate footballers
Expatriate footballers in Norway
Brazilian expatriate sportspeople in Norway
Expatriate footballers in Finland
Brazilian expatriate sportspeople in Finland
Expatriate soccer players in Canada
Brazilian expatriate sportspeople in Canada
Expatriate soccer players in the United States
Brazilian expatriate sportspeople in the United States
Major Arena Soccer League players
Baltimore Blast players
Footballers from São Paulo
Azusa Pacific Cougars men's soccer players
Florida Tropics SC players